M. Eric Johnson is Dean of the Owen Graduate School of Management, Vanderbilt University.  Formerly, he was Associate Dean and the Benjamin Ames Kimball Professor at the Tuck School of Business at Dartmouth College in Hanover, New Hampshire, United States.  He was also Director of the Glassmeyer/McNamee Center for Digital Strategies. Prior to Tuck, he was a professor at management at Vanderbilt University and a development engineer at Hewlett-Packard.

His teaching and research focuses on the IT strategy in supply chain management and impact of information technology on healthcare.   Through grants from the National Institute of Standards and Technology, Department of Justice, the Department of Homeland Security, and the National Science Foundation, he is studying how information security and trust effect supply chain relationships.  His book, Managing Information Risk and the Economics of Security (Springer 2009) examines how organizations can protect their information assets.  He has testified before the US Congress on information security and collaboration and published many related articles in the Financial Times, Sloan Management Review, Harvard Business Review, and CIO Magazine.

His achievements include the Dean's Award for Teaching Excellence, Owen Graduate School of Management, Vanderbilt University, 1995, 1997; winner, CIBER/POMS international case competition, 2000; Accenture Award for outstanding research paper in logistics, 2001. Research funding: Departments of Homeland Security and Justice, 2005– present; U.S. Bureau of Justice, 2005–07; National Institute of Standards and Technology, 2006–07

He is currently the department editor for Production and Operations Management, on the editorial boards of International Journal of Logistics Management and Electronic Markets, and Interfaces. Johnson received his undergraduate and master's degrees from Pennsylvania State University and his doctorate from Stanford University.

References

Tuck School of Business faculty
Vanderbilt University faculty
Stanford University alumni
Penn State College of Engineering alumni
Living people
Business school deans
Year of birth missing (living people)